The 1988 Arab Cup was the fifth edition of the Arab Cup hosted by Amman, Jordan. The defending champion Iraq won the title for the 4th time.

Qualification
Jordan qualified automatically as hosts and Iraq as holders.

Zone 1 (Gulf Area)

Bahrain & Kuwait qualified.

Zone 2 (Red Sea)

Egypt & Saudi Arabia qualified.

Zone 3 (North Africa)
The tournament was held in Algiers, Algeria. Libya and Morocco withdrew.

Algeria & Tunisia qualified.

Zone 4 (East Region)

Syria qualified.

Qualified teams
The 8 qualified teams are:

Final tournament

Venues

Squads

Group stage 
Algeria and Saudi Arabia did not send their senior national teams to the competition. Instead, Algeria sent a University XI, probably an Under-23 squad, while Saudi Arabia's A team was in Australia during the tournament.

Group A

Group B

Knock-out stage

Semi-finals

Third place play-off

Final

Top scorers 
4 Goals
  Ahmed Radhi

2 Goals

  Tarek Hadj Adlane
  Hossam Hassan
  Nart Yadaje
  Mahmoud Hamoud
  Mohammad Jakalan

References

External links 
 Details in RSSSF

 
1988
1988 in African football
1988 in Asian football
1988–89 in Saudi Arabian football
1988–89 in Iraqi football
1988–89 in Qatari football
1988–89 in Bahraini football
1988 in Jordanian sport
1988 in Syrian sport
1988 in Egyptian sport
1988 in Tunisian sport
1988–89 in Lebanese football
1988–89 in Kuwaiti football
1988–89 in Syrian football
Sports competitions in Amman
July 1988 sports events in Asia